George Moore Pritchard (January 4, 1886 – April 24, 1955) was a lawyer, Republican politician, and one-term U.S. representative from North Carolina.  He was the son of Senator Jeter C. Pritchard and Augusta Ray.

Pritchard served in the North Carolina House of Representatives in 1916 and 1917. In 1928, Pritchard was elected to the 71st United States Congress from North Carolina's 10th congressional district. In 1930, he did not run for re-election, but instead ran unsuccessfully for the U.S. Senate against Democrat Josiah W. Bailey. All his later attempts at political comebacks—running for Governor of North Carolina in 1940 and 1948, and for the U.S. House in 1952—were unsuccessful.

External links
Congressional Biography
Profile at OurCampaigns.com

|-

|-

1886 births
1955 deaths
People from Mars Hill, North Carolina
North Carolina lawyers
American people of Welsh descent
Republican Party members of the North Carolina House of Representatives
Republican Party members of the United States House of Representatives from North Carolina
20th-century American politicians
20th-century American lawyers